Maxim Alexandrovich Galkin (born 18 June 1976) is a Russian comedian, television presenter and singer.  Galkin left Russia in March 2022 following the Russian invasion of Ukraine and was subsequently listed as a foreign agent by the Russian government.

Biography

He first became famous as an impersonator and is known for his talent at parody and his duets with the famous Russian pop singer Alla Pugacheva and Ani Lorak.

Galkin was the host of the Russian version of Who Wants to Be a Millionaire? before 2009.

In 2010, Galkin was one of the few comedians performing an impression, albeit 'light-hearted', of President Vladimir Putin, on Russia's Channel One TV channel.

On New Year's Eve in 2013, Galkin and the then popular Ukrainian comedian Volodymyr Zelenskyy performed together in a traditional New Year's program called “Little Blue Light” on the Russia-1 TV channel. Russian TV presenter Vladimir Solovyov, who later became a leading Kremlin propagandist, also appeared on the show as one of the presenters and danced in the audience during Galkin and Zelenskyy's performance.

After November 2016 he hosted a children's talent show on TV "Best of all", and did so at least until mid-2017.

Personal life

Galkin is Jewish, from his mother's side.

Since 2001, Galkin had been romantically involved with the famed Soviet and Russian singer Alla Pugacheva. On December 24, 2011, the couple married, despite the significant age gap.
On September 18, 2013 Galkin and Pugacheva became the biological parents of twins via a surrogate mother – Elizaveta and Harry. In August 2022, Russian media reports suggested that his wife and children may have returned to Russia, and in September 2022, Russia listed him as a foreign agent.

Political views 
Galkin has been openly critical about the Russian invasion of Ukraine. He accused the Russian authorities of hypocrisy and lies with respect to war crimes that Russia has committed in firing rockets at the Ukrainian city of Odesa, its siege and destruction of Mariupol and its atrocities in Bucha. 

He spoke up negatively about the Russian gay propaganda law, comparing it to a 'witch-hunt', which is created only for political PR and public distraction from more important issues. However, he does not deem it necessary to legalize same-sex marriage and LGBT adoption because it can provoke a negative reaction in society.

Awards
 Medal "For Faith and Goodness" of Kemerovo Oblast (2004)
 Order of Friendship (2006)
 Order of Honor of Kuzbass (2013)

References

External links
 
 
 Maxim Galkin at the Forbes 

Living people
1976 births
People from Naro-Fominsky District
Russian activists against the 2022 Russian invasion of Ukraine
Russian Jews
Russian Orthodox Christians from Russia
Russian male comedians
Russian game show hosts
Russian comedy musicians
Russian television personalities
Russian parodists
Russian male television actors
Russian State University for the Humanities alumni
Fabrika Zvyozd
Russian YouTubers
Russian stand-up comedians
People listed in Russia as foreign agents
Comedy YouTubers